Melchior H. M. J. F. C. Wathelet (born 6 March 1949) is a Belgian politician and member of the Humanist Democratic Centre who served as 4th Minister-President of Wallonia. He has degrees in law and in economics (University of Liège) and is a Master of Laws (Harvard University). He is also a professor at the Catholic University of Louvain and the Université de Liège. From 1995 to 2003 he was a Judge at the European Court of Justice. In 2012-2018, Wathelet served as Advocate-General at the Court of Justice.

Political career 
Member of the Chamber of Representatives (1977–1995)
Secretary of State for Regional Economy of the Walloon Region (1980–1981)
Minister of New Technologies and SMEs of the Walloon Region (1981–1985)
Minister-President of the Walloon Region (1985–1988)
Deputy Prime Minister and Minister of Justice and Middle Classes (1988–1992)
Deputy Prime Minister and Minister of Justice and Economic Affairs (1992–1995)
Deputy Prime Minister and Minister of Defence (1995)
Mayor of Verviers (1995)

Controversy
As Justice Minister he had, according to David Canter, "encouraged the early release of many sex offenders" which included Marc Dutroux, a convicted child molester and subsequent serial killer. This particular release resulted in the European Parliament calling for his resignation as an ECJ judge in 1997. The European Parliament does not have the right to appoint ECJ judges, and it was the first time that it attempted to influence their selection.

See also
List of members of the European Court of Justice

References

1949 births
Living people
Advocates General of the European Court of Justice
Belgian Ministers of State
Centre démocrate humaniste politicians
European Court of Justice judges
Government ministers of Belgium
Harvard Law School alumni
Mayors of places in Belgium
Members of the Belgian Federal Parliament
Ministers-President of Wallonia
University of Liège alumni
Academic staff of the University of Liège
Belgian Ministers of Defence
21st-century Belgian politicians
Belgian judges of international courts and tribunals
Belgian officials of the European Union